Group F of the EuroBasket 2013 took place between 12 to 16 September 2013. The group played all of its games at Arena Stožice in Ljubljana, Slovenia.

The group composed of the best three teams from Group C and D. The four best ranked teams advanced to the knockout stage.

Standings
|}

All times are local (UTC+2)

12 September

Finland vs. Croatia

Greece vs. Spain

Slovenia vs. Italy

14 September

Croatia vs. Italy

Spain vs. Finland

Greece vs. Slovenia

16 September

Croatia vs. Greece

Italy vs. Spain

Finland vs. Slovenia

External links
Standings and fixtures

Group F
2013–14 in Croatian basketball
2013–14 in Slovenian basketball
2013–14 in Spanish basketball
2013–14 in Italian basketball
2013–14 in Greek basketball
2013 in Finnish sport